James Herbert Shinner (9 September 1877 – 10 November 1921), sometimes known as Bert Shinner, was an English professional footballer who played in the Football League for Doncaster Rovers and Bradford City as a centre forward and full back.

Personal life 
Shinner had three spells serving in the Royal Navy (1894–1902, 1903–1908), with a final spell as a minelayer between 2 August and 6 December 1916, during the First World War. He was later invalided out of the military, suffering from tuberculosis. Shinner worked as a poultry farmer during the last years of his life.

Career statistics

References

1877 births
1921 deaths
Sportspeople from Dudley
English footballers
Association football forwards
Dudley Town F.C. players
Middlesbrough F.C. players
Aberdeen F.C. players
Bradford City A.F.C. players
Doncaster Rovers F.C. players
Brentford F.C. players
Barrow A.F.C. players
Bristol City F.C. players
Southend United F.C. players
Watford F.C. players
Spennymoor United F.C. players
Scottish Football League players
English Football League players
Southern Football League players
Royal Navy personnel of World War I
Royal Navy sailors

Royal Navy personnel